Ambrose A. Call State Park is a state park of Iowa, United States, that commemorates the first European settler in Kossuth County. The park preserves rugged hills of old-growth forest on the East Fork of the Des Moines River.

History
Ambrose A. Call and his brother Asa staked their claim on the site of the future park on July 9, 1854. The next day Ambrose and traveling companion William Smith started building a log cabin while Asa went back to retrieve his family and more supplies. In 1925 Ambrose's daughter donated the site to the state of Iowa for a public park. While the original cabin is gone, a similar structure was moved from a nearby homestead and placed approximately where Ambrose's cabin stood.

Facilities
Ambrose A. Call State Park boasts a log cabin-style lodge built in 1928 that can be rented for events. There is a campground with 16 sites, all but three with electrical hookups.  of trails wind through the forest and in winter there is a cross-country skiing trail.

References

External links
 at Iowa Department of Natural Resources

State parks of Iowa
Protected areas established in 1925
Protected areas of Kossuth County, Iowa
1925 establishments in Iowa